Liz Patricia Benavides Vargas (born February 9, 1969) is a Peruvian lawyer. On June 20, 2022, she was elected as the Peruvian attorney general.

Early life 
Benavides was born on February 9, 1969, in Huancavelica. 

Benavides studied law at the Universidad de Lima and also at the Universidad Alas Peruanas, where she obtained a doctorate in Human Rights and a master's degree, also in the Human Rights category.  
Benavides also traveled to Chile, where she lived for a while after enrolling at the Universidad del Desarrollo de Chile in Santiago, graduating from there with a post-degree in business legal advice. She also traveled to, and lived for a short period in, Spain, where she studied at Universidad de Jaen and obtained a master's degree in criminal law and constitutional guarantees.

Career 
Prior to becoming Peru's attorney general, Benavides had worked closely with the five Peruvian attorney generals before her, and she pushed for some notable cases (such as the "La Centralita", "Red Orellana" and "Los Cuellos Blancos del Puerto" cases) to be seen and those involved in them prosecuted. Many of those cases garnered national and international attention.

On June 20, 2022, Benavides was voted as the new attorney general, and on July 2, she was sworn in as the country's attorney general. She is scheduled to hold the position until 2025.

She has declared that investigating Peruvian president Pedro Castillo will be one of her top priorities during her term as attorney general. She also announced investigations into Castillo's successor, Dina Boluarte, as well as others for actions committed during the 2022–2023 Peruvian political protests.

Family problems 
Benavides' sister, judge Emma Benavides Vargas, has been investigated for alleged connections to a criminal organization. Benavides fired the prosecutor, Bersabeth Revilla, who was investigating her sister, from her (Revilla's) job.

On August 3, 2022, Benavides denied using her position to help her sister out.

References 

Living people
1969 births
Peruvian lawyers
Peruvian women lawyers
Attorneys general
University of Lima alumni
People from Huancavelica Region